Ujikaji is an independent record label and event organiser in Singapore.

Background 
Ujikaji means "experiment" in Malay, and the label's interests lie in the curation of experimental music, with a special focus on Southeast Asian artists and sounds. The label supports independent artists with platforms to perform their music, as well as in producing and releasing their music, and establishing a complementary partnership that allows them to focus on the creative aspects of music-making. Ujikaji has released works by Magus (Leslie Low and Mark Dolmont), Dream State Vision (Shaun Sankaran), Awk Wah (Shark Fung), The Observatory, Pan Gu (Leslie Low and Lasse Marhaug), Tim O'Dwyer, PUPA, Yuen Chee Wai, Yan Jun and FEN.

Having established a semi-regular night of experimental and improvised music at now-defunct cafe and bar, Artistry, Ujikaji currently co-presents, with The Observatory, the BlackKaji series of performances at Black Axis. According to musicians NADA: "What Ujikaji does is Singapore’s answer to the spirit and curation found in places like John Zorn’s The Stone on the Lower East Side in New York City or Café OTO in east London." Along with fellow veteran independent Singapore label KITCHEN. LABEL, Ujikaji was cited as having "done a lot for the experimental scene in Singapore" and paving the way for newer experimental labels like Evening Chants to emerge.

Artists

Acid Mothers Temple & the Melting Paraiso U.F.O.
Awk Wah
Dream State Vision
FEN
George Chua
Haino Keiji
Lasse Marhaug
Magus
Marco Fusinato
The Observatory
Pan Gu
PUPA
Tim O'Dwyer
Yan Jun
Yuen Chee Wai

Discography

See also
List of record labels

References

External links
 Bandcamp
 Facebook
 Discogs

Experimental music record labels